Disney Channel is a children's television channel owned and operated by The Walt Disney Company Limited. Broadcasting in the Czech Republic, Slovakia and Hungary, the latter receiving it with a Hungarian audio track. It was previously known as Fox Kids, and later as Jetix. It was first launched in Hungary in September 2000, and was later expanded to the Czech Republic and Slovakia in February 2001.

History
After Disney XD successfully launched on 13 February 2009 in the US, Disney-ABC Television Group rolled it out to France on 1 April 2009 and it was expected to be rolled out to other European territories in 2009. In 2009, Disney announced that the Jetix channel in certain countries (namely the Czech Republic, Slovakia, Romania, Hungary, Romania and Bulgaria) would be rebranded as Disney Channel, marking that channel's first introduction in these countries. The channel was replaced on 19 September 2009.

On 3 May 2011, Disney Channel Central Europe started using the same and updated on-air logo as in the United States, along with several other Disney Channels across Europe, completing its transitional rebrand to the new look. The new logo has debuted on the Czech feed first, prior to appearing on the UK, German, French, Dutch and Spanish feeds. The Playhouse Disney programming block was rebranded to Disney Junior in the Czech Republic and Slovakia on June 1, 2011.

Since 2012, most of the channel's promos are being produced in widescreen. In December 2012, Disney Channel Central Europe has adapted the same on-air presentation and graphics, with minor differences, used by Disney Channel UK. This update has been fully complete in spring.

In June 2014, Disney Channel Central Europe adapted the new logo currently used by Disney Channel Germany. It started broadcasting in 16:9 widescreen format from 29 January 2015.

References

External links
 Disney Channel Česko

Czech Republic
Television channels and stations established in 2001
Children's television networks
Television stations in the Czech Republic
Television channels and stations established in 2009
2009 establishments in the Czech Republic
Czech-language television stations